Scudamore is a surname. Notable people with the surname include:

 Barnabas Scudamore (1609–1651), English soldier who commanded Royalist troops in the English Civil War
Berkeley Lionel Scudamore Dallard (1889–1983), New Zealand accountant, senior public servant and prison administrator
Brian Scudamore, of 1-800-GOT-JUNK?, a junk removal company with franchises in Canada, the United States and Australia
Charles FitzRoy-Scudamore (1713–1782), British politician
Claude Scudamore Jarvis CMG OBE (born 1879), British colonial governor, Arabist and naturalist noted for his rapport with the desert Bedouin
Dave Scudamore, the 1997 US Marathon champion
Edward Scudamore-Stanhope, 12th Earl of Chesterfield (1889–1952), son of Henry Edwyn Chandos Scudamore-Stanhope, 9th Earl of Chesterfield
Edwyn Scudamore-Stanhope, 10th Earl of Chesterfield KG, GCVO, PC (1854–1933), styled Lord Stanhope between 1883 and 1887, a British peer and courtier
Enid Scudamore-Stanhope, Countess of Chesterfield, born 10 September 1878 at Marske Hall in Yorkshire
Frank Ives Scudamore, (1823–1884) Receiver and accountant general of the British Post Office, responsible for the Post Office acquiring the telegraph system
Henry Scudamore, 3rd Duke of Beaufort (1707–1745), the elder son of Henry Somerset, 2nd Duke of Beaufort and his second wife, Rachel Noel
Henry Scudamore-Stanhope, 11th Earl of Chesterfield (1855–1935), the second son of Henry Edwyn Chandos Scudamore-Stanhope, 9th Earl of Chesterfield
Henry Scudamore-Stanhope, 9th Earl of Chesterfield, DL, JP, (1821–1887), the first son of four of Sir Edwyn Francis Scudamore-Stanhope, 2nd Baronet
James Scudamore, 3rd Viscount Scudamore (1684–1716), English politician
James Scudamore (1624–1668) (1624–1668), English politician
James Scudamore (author) (born 1976), author
James Scudamore (veterinarian), the Chief Veterinary Officer (CVO) of the United Kingdom from April 1997 until he retired March 2004
John Scudamore, 1st Viscount Scudamore (1601–1671), English diplomat and politician who sat in the House of Commons at various times between 1621 and 1629
John Scudamore (courtier), (1542–1623), the eldest son of William Scudamore
John Scudamore (landowner), 15th century English landowner from Herefordshire
Margaret Scudamore (1884–1958), English actress who began in ingenue roles
Mary Scudamore (née Shelton) (1550–1603), courtier and the daughter of Sir John Shelton of Shelton Hall, Norfolk
Michael Scudamore Redgrave, CBE (1908–1985), English stage and film actor, director, manager and author
Peter Scudamore (born 1958), known universally as 'Scu', a former jockey and trainer in National Hunt racing
Richard Scudamore, currently Chief Executive of the F.A. Premier League, a position he has held since November 1999
Sir James Scudamore (also spelled Skidmore, Skidmur or Skidmuer) (1568–1619), gentleman usher at the court of Queen Elizabeth I
Tom Scudamore (born 1982), third-generation British flat and steeplechase jockey
Viscount Scudamore, title in the Peerage of Ireland

See also
Fifield Scudamore, also known as Fifield Bavant, a very small village and former civil parish in Wiltshire, England
Upton Scudamore, village in Wiltshire, England, located about a mile north of the town of Warminster
Cudmore (disambiguation)
Scott damore